Robert Ernest Gompf (born 1957) is an American mathematician specializing in geometric topology.

Gompf received a Ph.D. in 1984 from the University of California, Berkeley under the supervision of Robion Kirby (An invariant for Casson handles, disks and knot concordants). He is now a professor at the University of Texas at Austin.

His research concerns the topology of 4-manifolds. In 1990, he demonstrated with Tomasz Mrowka that there is a simply connected irreducible 4-manifold that admits no complex structures. In 1995, he constructed new examples of simply connected compact symplectic 4-manifolds that are not homeomorphic or diffeomorphic to complex manifolds (Kähler manifolds).

He is a fellow of the American Mathematical Society. He was an invited speaker at the International Congress of Mathematicians in 1994 in Zurich (Smooth four-manifolds and symplectic topology).

Writings 
With András I. Stipsicz: 4-manifolds and Kirby calculus, AMS 1999
A new construction of symplectic manifolds, Annals of Mathematics, Volume 142, 1995, p. 527–595
With Tomasz Mrowka Irreducible four manifolds need not be complex, Annals of Mathematics, Volume 138, 1993, p. 61–111
Handlebody construction of Stein surfaces, Annals of Mathematics, Volume 148, 1998, p. 619–693

Notes

External links 
Homepage

1957 births
Living people
20th-century American mathematicians
21st-century American mathematicians
Fellows of the American Mathematical Society